Forest Hill is a historic home located near Amherst, Amherst County, Virginia.  The original section was built about 1803, with two-story wings added later in the 19th century.  It is a two-story, frame I-house with interior Federal style detailing. Also on the property are the contributing tobacco barn (c. 1900), smokehouse (c. 1800), tenant house (c. 1900), corncrib (c. 1800), crib barn (c. 1800), and tool shed (c. 1900).

In 1847, owner William Waller, aged 58, walked from Forest Hill to Louisiana with about 20 slaves for sale. His letters home during the trip, held by the Virginia Historical Society, provide rare documentation of a slave coffle.

Forest Hill was added to the National Register of Historic Places in 2006.

References

Houses in Amherst County, Virginia
Houses completed in 1803
Federal architecture in Virginia
Houses on the National Register of Historic Places in Virginia
National Register of Historic Places in Amherst County, Virginia
I-houses in Virginia